"She Let Herself Go" is a song written by Dean Dillon and Kerry Kurt Phillips, and recorded by American country music singer George Strait.  It was released in September 2005 as the second single from Strait's album Somewhere Down in Texas.  The song reached the top of the Billboard Hot Country Songs chart in January 2006.  The song became Strait's 40th Number One single on the U.S. Billboard Hot Country Songs charts, tying the record held at the time by Conway Twitty.

Content
The song is a mid-tempo describing a woman whose male lover has just left her. Although the male presumes that the female will "let herself go" in the traditional sense of that expression; in other words, that she will refrain from keeping her physical, emotional, or aesthetic stature in check. The phrase "she let herself go" is then given a different meaning in the chorus, where it is revealed that she "let herself go" on excursions that he had never let her do before, such as going on a singles cruise, a spa in New York City, or on a trip to the beach.

Critical reception
Stephen Thomas Erlewine reviewed the song favorably, calling it a "clever breakup tale".

Chart positions
"She Let Herself Go" debuted at number 49 on the U.S. Billboard Hot Country Songs for the week of September 17, 2005.

Year-end charts

Certifications

References

2005 singles
Country ballads
2000s ballads
George Strait songs
Songs written by Dean Dillon
Song recordings produced by Tony Brown (record producer)
MCA Nashville Records singles
Songs written by Kerry Kurt Phillips
2005 songs